The 1996–97 Argentine Torneo Argentino A was the second season of third division professional football in Argentina. A total of 22 teams competed; the champion was promoted to Primera B Nacional.

Club information

Zone A

Play their home games at Estadio José María Minella.

Zone B

Zone C

Zone D

Teams from Argentino B that played the Final Stage

First stage

Zone A

Zone B

Zone C

Zone D

Second stage

Championship Stage

Zone A

Zone B

Relegation Playoffs

First stage

|-
!colspan="5"|Relegation/promotion playoff 1

|-
!colspan="5"|Relegation/promotion playoff 2

|-
!colspan="5"|Relegation/promotion playoff 3

CAI is relegated to 1997–98 Torneo Argentino B and Germinal advances to Second Stage by winning the playoff.
Desamparados is relegated to 1997–98 Torneo Argentino B and Alvarado advances to Second Stage by winning the playoff.
San Martín (F) withdrew and is relegated to 1997–98 Torneo Argentino B and Unión Santiago advances to Second Stage by winning the playoff.

Second stage

Third stage

Championship Stage

Zone A

Zone B

See also
1996–97 in Argentine football

References

Torneo Argentino A seasons
3